The list of ship commissionings in 1879 includes a chronological list of all ships commissioned in 1879.


See also

References

1879
 Ship commissionings